Symbolophorus boops is a species of fish in the family Myctophidae.

References 

Myctophidae
Animals described in 1845